Pohoří na Šumavě (Bucherwald, Buchers bei Kaplitz, Buchers im Böhmerwald, Buchoř (1869–1910) or Půchoří) is a former village and municipality (obec) in Český Krumlov District in the South Bohemian Region of the Czech Republic. The settlement has been abandoned since the 1970s but now is being restored step by step. The village was named Pohoří na Šumavě in 1923 and nowadays is part of the municipality of Pohorská Ves.

Nature protection 
There are some small protected natural areas in the cadastre of Pohoří na Šumavě:
 Myslivna
 Pohořské rašeliniště
 Prameniště Pohořského potoka
 Stodůlecký vrch
 U tří můstků

References
Abandoned villages (CS)

Villages in Český Krumlov District